The Investigatory Powers Act 2016 (c. 25) (nicknamed the Snoopers' Charter) is an Act of the Parliament of the United Kingdom which received royal assent on 29 November 2016. Its different parts came into force on various dates from 30 December 2016. The Act comprehensively sets out and in limited respects expands the electronic surveillance powers of the British intelligence agencies and police. It also claims to improve the safeguards on the exercise of those powers.

Drafting and scrutiny 
In 2014 the British government asked David Anderson, the Independent Reviewer of Terrorism Legislation, to review the operation and regulation of investigatory powers available to law enforcement and intelligence agencies, in particular the interception of communications and communications data, and to recommend change. This report was published in June 2015 and recommended a new law to clarify these powers.

The Draft Investigatory Powers Bill was published in November 2015, with a large number of accompanying documents, and a Joint Committee of the House of Commons and House of Lords was established to scrutinise the draft bill. Some parts of the bill referring to bulk personal datasets came into effect in November 2015, before parliamentary scrutiny began. The Joint Committee published its pre-legislative scrutiny report in March 2016. The Government accepted the vast majority of its 198 recommendations, together with the recommendations of two other parliamentary committees that had scrutinised the draft Bill, and the revised bill was introduced in the House of Commons, where it was subject to debate by Members of Parliament.

In March 2016 the House of Commons passed the Investigatory Powers Bill on its second reading by 281 votes to 15, moving the bill to the committee stage. The Labour Party and Scottish National Party abstained from the vote, while the Liberal Democrats voted against it.

At the committee stage constitutional, technology, and human rights issues were examined. The Labour Chair of the Joint Committee on Human Rights, Harriet Harman, said:

At this stage, at the insistence of the Labour Party, the Independent Reviewer of Terrorism Legislation was commissioned to conduct a further review of the operational case for the bulk powers reserved under the Bill to the British intelligence agencies: bulk interception, bulk collection of metadata, bulk equipment interference and the retention and use of bulk datasets. That review was conducted with the help of a small, security-cleared expert team, and together with 60 case studies, was published in August 2016. Like the 2014-15 reports of the PCLOB and National Academy of Sciences in the US, it is a significant information source for the utility of so-called mass surveillance techniques

On 16 November 2016 the House of Lords approved the final version of the Investigatory Powers Bill, leaving only the formality of Royal Assent to be completed before the Bill became law.

On 21 December 2016, the European Court of Justice (ECJ) declared that the generalised retention of certain types of personal data is unlawful, although little is known as to how this will affect the Investigatory Powers Act at this stage. As of 29 January 2017, many sources have since reported on the Investigatory Powers Act as if it is currently in action. Draft codes of practice laid out by the Home Office in February 2017 did not provide insight on the Government's communications data code of practise, as it was for the Court of Appeal to decide how to apply the December ruling of the ECJ on data retention in member states. It was then reported in late February 2017 that the aspects of the Bill forcing communications service providers to retain data had been "mothballed" due to the ECJ ruling on the "general and indiscriminate" retention of communications data being illegal.

Provisions of the Act 
The Act:
 introduced new powers, and restated existing ones, for British intelligence agencies and law enforcement to carry out targeted interception of communications, bulk collection of communications data, and bulk interception of communications;
 created an Investigatory Powers Commission (IPC) to oversee the use of all investigatory powers, alongside the oversight provided by the Intelligence and Security Committee of Parliament and the Investigatory Powers Tribunal. The IPC consists of a number of serving or former senior judges. It combined and replaced the powers of the Interception of Communications Commissioner, Intelligence Services Commissioner, and Chief Surveillance Commissioner;
 established a requirement for a judge serving on the IPC to review warrants for accessing the content of communications and equipment interference authorised by a Secretary of State before they come into force;
 required communication service providers (CSPs) to retain British internet users' "Internet connection records" – which websites were visited but not the particular pages and not the full browsing history – for one year;
 allowed police, intelligence officers and other government department managers (listed below) to see the Internet connection records, as part of a targeted and filtered investigation, without a warrant;
 permitted the police and intelligence agencies to carry out targeted equipment interference, that is, hacking into computers or devices to access their data, and bulk equipment interference for national security matters related to foreign investigations;
 placed a legal obligation on CSPs to assist with targeted interception of data, and communications and equipment interference in relation to an investigation; foreign companies are not required to engage in bulk collection of data or communications;
 maintained an existing requirement on CSPs in the UK to have the ability to remove encryption applied by the CSP; foreign companies are not required to remove encryption;
 put the Wilson Doctrine on a statutory footing for the first time as well as safeguards for other sensitive professions such as journalists, lawyers and doctors;
 provided local government with some investigatory powers, for example to investigate someone fraudulently claiming benefits, but not access to Internet connection records;
 created a new criminal offence for unlawfully accessing internet data;
 created a new criminal offence for a CSP or someone who works for a CSP to reveal that data has been requested.

Investigatory Powers Commissioner 
The Act created the role of Investigatory Powers Commissioner to provide independent oversight of the use of investigatory powers by intelligence agencies, police forces and other public authorities. In March 2017 Lord Justice Sir Adrian Fulford, a Court of Appeal judge, was appointed as first Commissioner for a three-year term. His office (IPCO) will have fifteen senior judges as judicial commissioners, a technical advisory panel of scientific experts, and around 50 staff. The Act gives the prime minister the power to appoint the Investigatory Powers Commissioner and other Judicial Commissioners.

In January 2019 the Home Office blocked the appointment of Eric King as head of investigations at IPCO, citing national security grounds. King had previously been director of the Don't Spy On Us coalition, and deputy director of Privacy International for five years. King commented "The problem, at its heart, is that there’s a conflict as to whether my previous work and views are a positive or negative thing. They are both the reason I was hired and the reason my clearance was refused by the Home Office vetting team."

Investigatory Powers Commissioners have been:
March 2017 – October 2019 Sir Adrian Fulford
October 2019 – present Sir Brian Leveson

Authorities allowed to access Internet connection records 
List of authorities allowed to access Internet connection records without a warrant:

 Metropolitan Police Service
 City of London Police
 Police forces maintained under section 2 of the Police Act 1996
 Police Service of Scotland
 Police Service of Northern Ireland
 British Transport Police
 Ministry of Defence Police
 Royal Navy Police
 Royal Military Police
 Royal Air Force Police
 Security Service
 Secret Intelligence Service
 GCHQ
 Ministry of Defence
 Department of Health
 Home Office
 Ministry of Justice
 National Crime Agency
 HM Revenue & Customs
 Department for Transport
 Department for Work and Pensions
 NHS trusts and foundation trusts in England that provide ambulance services
 NHS National Services Scotland
 Competition and Markets Authority
 Criminal Cases Review Commission
 Department for Communities (Northern Ireland)
 Department for the Economy (Northern Ireland)
 Department of Justice (Northern Ireland)
 Financial Conduct Authority
 Fire and rescue authorities under the Fire and Rescue Services Act 2004
 Food Standards Agency
 Food Standards Scotland
 Gambling Commission
 Gangmasters and Labour Abuse Authority
 Health and Safety Executive
 Independent Police Complaints Commission
 Information Commissioner
 NHS Business Services Authority
 Northern Ireland Ambulance Service Health and Social Care Trust
 Northern Ireland Fire and Rescue Service Board
 Health & Social Care Business Services Organisation (Northern Ireland)
 Office of Communications
 Police Ombudsman for Northern Ireland
 Police Investigations and Review Commissioner
 Scottish Ambulance Service Board
 Scottish Criminal Cases Review Commission
 Serious Fraud Office
 Welsh Ambulance Services National Health Service Trust

Public debate

The draft Bill generated significant public debate about balancing intrusive powers and mass surveillance with the needs of the police and intelligence agencies to gain targeted access to information as part of their investigations. Although the Home Office said the Bill will be compatible with the European Convention on Human Rights, the content of the draft Bill has raised concerns about the impact on privacy.

Privacy campaigners say the bill clearly lays out the mass surveillance powers that would be at the disposal of the security services, and want it amended so that the surveillance is targeted and based on suspicion and argue that the powers are so sweeping, and the bill's language so general, that not just the security services but also government bodies will be able to analyse the records of millions of people even if they are not under suspicion.

In January 2016 a report published by the Intelligence and Security Committee of Parliament recommended that the bill should focus on the right to privacy. Committee chairman, Conservative MP Dominic Grieve, said: "We have therefore recommended that the new legislation contains an entirely new part dedicated to overarching privacy protections, which should form the backbone of the draft legislation around which the exceptional powers are then built. This will ensure that privacy is an integral part of the legislation rather than an add-on." The committee also recommended that Class bulk personal dataset warrants are removed from the legislation. Dominic Grieve later clarified the extent of these freedoms, "the principle of the right to privacy against the state is maintained except if there is a good and sufficient reason why that should not happen."

Gavin E. L. Hall, a doctoral researcher at the University of Birmingham, argues that public fear of the bill is not justified, writing that there are benefits to formally codifying in law what state security services can and cannot do and that "While it may technically be possible under the bill to impugn individual freedom, John Bull has little to fear."

The Register argued the Act enshrines parallel construction in law and allows the state to lie about the origins of evidence in court, treating it as infallible, and prohibit the defendant from questioning it.

Article 19, a freedom of expression campaign group, criticized the Act as one of the most draconian pieces of surveillance legislation passed worldwide, warning that it "offers a template for authoritarian regimes and seriously undermining the rights of its citizens to privacy and freedom of expression". The Chinese government cited the Snooper's Charter (officially the Draft Communications Data Bill) when defending its own intrusive anti-terrorism legislation.

Recent Wikileaks articles suggest that phone and digital device tracking both direct and indirect (e.g. FM radio blipping via Android exploit) also mentioned in Register posts by "Anonymous Coward" to covertly follow subjects have been used in the past but for operational reasons it is not clear if they are still used. The original poster has since decided to cooperate with the authorities and not comment further publicly on this subject, though the technique was independently rediscovered before the article in question was released.

Legal challenge and ruling 

In November 2016, a petition demanding the law be repealed gained 100,000 signatures. In December 2016, pornographic media site xHamster redirected UK traffic to the petition. In March 2017, Liberty, a human rights organisation, raised £50,000 via crowd funding towards legal actions against the bill. Silkie Carlo, policy officer at Liberty, said: 

In April 2018 the High Court of Justice ruled that the Investigatory Powers Act violates EU law. The government had until 1 November 2018 to amend the legislation. On 31 October 2018 The Data Retention and Acquisition Regulations 2018 came into force to address this ruling. These regulations increased the threshold for accessing communications data only for the purposes of serious crime (defined as offences which are capable of being sentenced to imprisonment for a term of 12 months or more) and requires that authorities consult an independent Investigatory Powers Commissioner before requesting data. The regulations also included a loophole where rapid approval can be made internally without independent approval but with a three-day expiry and with subsequent review by the independent body. Most debates about the regulations have been about the definition of "serious crime" with many arguing that the threshold should be at three years.

Implementation 
It was revealed in 2021 that two British ISPs were collaborating on a government initiative for the collection of Internet Connection Records.

See also 
 Intelligence Act (France)
 Draft Communications Data Bill, a draft bill produced for consultation in 2012 but never introduced to Parliament
  (German law)
 Mass surveillance in the United Kingdom
 Patriot Act

References

External links 
 Full text of the act as enacted at legislation.gov.uk
 
 
 
 

Surveillance
Government databases in the United Kingdom
Law enforcement techniques
Counterterrorism
Mass surveillance in the United Kingdom
National security policies
Surveillance databases
2015 in British law
Home Office (United Kingdom)
GCHQ
2015 in British politics
Data laws of the United Kingdom
United Kingdom Acts of Parliament 2016
Theresa May